Squire is both a surname and a given name. Notable people with the name include:

Surname:
Aurin Squire, American producer, playwright, screenwriter and reporter
Chris Squire (1948–2015), bassist with the progressive rock group Yes
Damian Squire (born 1973), retired Australian rules footballer
Edward Squire (died 1598), English scrivener and sailor, and alleged conspirator against Queen Elizabeth I of England
Edward Squire (public servant) (1837–1893), Deputy Postmaster General and Superintendent of Telegraphs in South Australia
Feargus B. Squire (1850–1932), American businessman and politician
Henry Squire, Archdeacon of Barnstaple from 1554 to 1582
J. C. Squire (1884–1958), British poet and historian
James Squire (1754-1822), transportee and brewer credited with the first successful cultivation of hops in Australia
Jeff Squire (born 1951), Welsh former international rugby union player
John Squire (born 1962), British rock guitarist
Katherine Squire (1903–1995), American actress
Larry Squire, American psychologist
Lovell Squire (1809–1892), Quaker schoolteacher
Matt Squire (born 1976), American music producer
Nikki Squire (born 1967), Irish cricketer
Peter Squire (born 1945), retired Royal Air Force air chief marshal
Rachel Squire (1954–2006), British Labour politician
Raglan Squire (1912-2004), British architect; son of J. C. Squire
Robin Squire (born 1944), British Conservative politician
Ronald Squire (1886-1958), British character actor
Rosemary Squire (born 1956), British theatre producer
Samuel Squire (1714–1766), bishop of the Church of England and historian
Stanley John Squire (1915-1998), Canadian politician
Watson C. Squire (1838-1926), governor of Washington Territory and later United States Senator from the state of Washington
William Squire (1917–1989), Welsh actor
William Henry Squire (1871–1963), British composer and cellist

Ciaran Squire (1989–), British carpenter living in New Zealand

Given name:
Squire Bancroft (1841-1926), English actor and manager
Squire Bence (1597–1648), English merchant, seafarer and member of the House of Commons
Squire Boone (1744-1815), American pioneer and brother of Daniel Boone
Squire S. Case {1801-1878), American businessman and politician
Squire Parsons (born 1948), American Southern Gospel singer and songwriter
Squire Reid (1887–1949), Australian politician
Squire J. Vickers (1872–1947), a chief architect of the New York City subway system
Squire Whipple (1804-1888), civil engineer considered the father of iron bridge building in America
Squire (died 1837), American escaped slave and gang leader who went by the nom-de-plume Bras-Coupé

See also
Squires (surname)

English-language surnames
Surnames of Norman origin